The 2016 season was the Kansas City Chiefs' 47th in the National Football League (NFL), their 57th overall and their fourth under head coach Andy Reid and the fourth and final season under general manager John Dorsey who was fired June 22, 2017. The Chiefs clinched their first AFC West division title since 2010. The Chiefs also clinched a first-round bye for the first time since 2003, but lost to the Pittsburgh Steelers in the Divisional round 16–18. The Chiefs finished 12–4, just like the Oakland Raiders, but the AFC West title was given to the Chiefs because of their two victories over the Raiders that season.

Violation of anti-tampering policy
On March 9, 2016, the NFL announced that the Chiefs had violated the league's anti-tampering policy, while pursuing wide receiver Jeremy Maclin during the 2015 off-season. The NFL defines tampering as prospective teams contacting soon-to-be free agents before NFL policies allow, which is two days prior to the beginning of the new league year. As punishment, the Chiefs forfeited their 2016 third-round selection, a 2017 sixth-round selection, and were fined $250,000. In addition, head coach Andy Reid was fined $75,000 and general manager John Dorsey was fined $25,000. The Chiefs immediately appealed the decision believing the punishment was excessively harsh and inconsistent with punishments that have given to other teams in similar situations. On April 19, the NFL denied the Chiefs appeal however they did reduce the team's fine to $200,000 and Reid's fine to $60,000.

NFL Top 100
The Chiefs had an NFL best 9 players in the annual Top 100 Players countdown.

Roster changes

Offseason

Reserve/future free agent contracts

Retirements

Free agents

Draft

Notes
 The Chiefs forfeited their original third-round selection (what would have been the 91st overall selection) as part of the punishment for violating the NFL's anti-tampering policy.
 The Chiefs acquired an additional fifth-round selection in a trade that sent safety Kelcie McCray to the Seattle Seahawks.
 The Chiefs traded their 1st round draft pick (28th overall) and 7th round pick (249th overall) to the San Francisco 49ers in exchange for the 49ers 2nd round pick (37th overall), 4th round pick (105th overall), and 6th round pick (178th overall)
 The Chiefs traded their 2nd round draft pick (59th overall) to the Tampa Bay Buccaneers in exchange the Buccaneers 3rd round pick (74th overall) and 4th round selection (106th overall)

Undrafted free agents

Players signed from rookie mini camp tryouts

Cuts

Players cut in the offseason before playing for the Chiefs

Camp transactions

Cuts

Signings

Preseason transactions

Cuts

Signings

Trades

Roster cut downs

Regular season transactions
Trades

Cuts

Signings

Players involved in multiple transactions
This list is for players who were involved in more than one transaction during the season

Staff

Final roster

Preseason

Regular season

Schedule

Note: Intra-division opponents are in bold text.

Game summaries

Week 1: vs. San Diego Chargers

Week 2: at Houston Texans

Week 3: vs. New York Jets

The Chiefs picked off the Jets six times.

Week 4: at Pittsburgh Steelers

Week 6: at Oakland Raiders

Week 7: vs. New Orleans Saints

Week 8: at Indianapolis Colts

Week 9: vs. Jacksonville Jaguars

Week 10: at Carolina Panthers

Week 11: vs. Tampa Bay Buccaneers

Week 12: at Denver Broncos

Week 13: at Atlanta Falcons

Week 14: vs. Oakland Raiders

Week 15: vs. Tennessee Titans

Week 16: vs. Denver Broncos
NFL on Christmas Day

Week 17: at San Diego Chargers

Postseason

Schedule

Game summaries

AFC Divisional Playoffs: vs. (3) Pittsburgh Steelers

Standings

Division

Conference

References

External links
 

Kansas City
Kansas City Chiefs seasons
Kansas City Chiefs
AFC West championship seasons